Jacob Ryan Trouba (born February 26, 1994) is an American professional ice hockey defenseman and captain of the New York Rangers of the National Hockey League (NHL). Trouba was drafted by the Winnipeg Jets in the first round, ninth overall, of the 2012 NHL Entry Draft. Trouba played the first six years of his career in Winnipeg before he was traded to the Rangers in 2019. 

He was named the 29th Rangers Captain in 2022 ahead of the 2022–23 season, a role which had been vacant since 2018 when Ryan McDonagh was traded to the Tampa Bay Lightning.

Playing career

Amateur
As a youth, Trouba played in the 2007 Quebec International Pee-Wee Hockey Tournament with the Detroit Compuware minor ice hockey team. He later played two seasons with the USA Hockey National Team Development Program in the United States Hockey League (USHL) and at several international tournaments. He was drafted by the Winnipeg Jets in the first round, ninth overall of the 2012 NHL Entry Draft. 

After finishing his junior hockey career, Trouba joined the University of Michigan for the 2012–13 season, where he played in 37 games for the Wolverines in his first season, scoring 12 goals and 17 assists. At the end of the season, Trouba was named a First Team All-American and was also honored as the Central Collegiate Hockey Association's (CCHA) Best Offensive Defenseman. He was also named first team All-CCHA and an All-CCHA Rookie. Trouba was also named as the team's Most Valuable Player and Best Defenseman. He was the only freshman on the All-American team as well as being the first freshman in the history of the University of Michigan hockey to be named a First Team All-American. At the conclusion of his freshman campaign, Trouba announced he was leaving the team to begin his professional career with the Jets.

Professional

Winnipeg Jets

On October 1, 2013, Trouba played his first career NHL game for the Jets, scoring his first NHL goal against Devan Dubnyk of the Edmonton Oilers. He also added an assist in the game and was named the game's first star. During his rookie season, 2013–14, Trouba missed over a month of action after he was injured when he fell into the boards during a game against the St. Louis Blues. He remained upbeat in the aftermath of his injury, updating fans on Twitter by saying, "If you were wondering, the boards are not edible. I'll be back soon."

On September 23, 2016, Trouba released a statement through his agent stating that he had requested a trade from the Jets. However, on November 7, he agreed to a two-year, $6 million contract extension with the Jets.

Following the Jets' successful 2018 playoffs in which the team reached the Conference Finals for the first time in franchise history, Trouba filed for salary arbitration. On July 22, 2018, he was awarded a one-year, $5.5 million extension with the Jets. Trouba finished the 2018–19 regular season with 50 points, and was one of only three defensemen under 25 to score 50 points or more, along with Morgan Rielly and Thomas Chabot.

New York Rangers
Following the 2018–19 season, Trouba and the Jets were once again unable to come to terms on an extension. On June 17, 2019, Trouba was traded by the Jets to the New York Rangers in exchange for Neal Pionk and Winnipeg's own first round pick in the 2019 NHL Entry Draft, which had been previously acquired by the Rangers in exchange for the Jets receiving Kevin Hayes. 

On July 19, 2019, the Rangers signed Trouba to a seven-year, $56 million free agent contract worth an average annual value of $8 million. The deal drew criticism from the many hockey people who believed the front office grossly overpaid for a physical, defense-minded defenseman who had limited offensive upside. Trouba failed to score as many as 40 points in any of his first three seasons with the team. Per Spotrac, he entered the 2021-22 season as the 14th highest-paid defenseman in the league.

Trouba scored his first goal for the Rangers, as well as two assists, during the 2019–20 season opener on October 3 against his former team, the Winnipeg Jets. Trouba tied a career-high in points, and he became the first defenseman to register three points in a Rangers debut.

During the off-season, Trouba was named the 28th captain in franchise history. He is the first captain since Ryan McDonagh was traded during the 2017-18 season. He also becomes the 12th defenseman in team history to be named captain and the fourth consecutive U.S.-born player to wear the "C" on his sweater after Chris Drury (2008–11), Ryan Callahan (2011–14) and McDonagh (2014–18). Trouba had served as an alternate captain the previous two years while being lauded for his leadership abilities by both his first Rangers coach, David Quinn, and his successor, Gerard Gallant.

During the 2022–23 season, during a 5-2 loss to the Chicago Blackhawks at home, Trouba was involved in two separate on-ice incidents. In the first period, he fought Jujhar Khaira, whom he had concussed and knocked unconscious with an open-ice hit in the last game between the Rangers and Blackhawks the previous season. Then, in the second-period, with the Blackhawks leading 3-0, Trouba delivered an open-ice hit to Andreas Athanasiou, inciting a line brawl that included a fight between Trouba and Blackhawks captain Jonathan Toews. After the brawl, Trouba yelled at and threw his helmet towards the Rangers bench. The incident and game was seen as a turning point in the Rangers season, who would go on a 22-4-4 run in their next 30 games.

International play

Trouba spent much of his amateur career playing for the U.S. National Team Development Program in the USHL and at several international tournaments. He represented his country at two World Under-18 Championships, one World Junior Championships and at one World Senior Championship. In 2011 and 2012, Trouba captured gold medals with the U.S. at the World Under-18 Championships.

Trouba was the youngest player on the American team at the 2012 World Junior Championship. In 2013, he represented the United States at both the junior and senior levels, capturing gold and bronze medals, respectively. At the World Junior Championship in 2013, Trouba was named the tournament's top defenseman and earned a spot on the All-Star Team.

Personal life
Trouba's father John is a marketing executive, and his mother Kristy Trouba is in the medical billing field. Trouba grew up in the Rochester, Michigan, area and attended Rochester Community schools before moving during high school to pursue his hockey career in Ann Arbor, Michigan, on the U.S. National Team Development Program.

On June 28, 2020, he posted on Instagram that he married his long-time girlfriend, Kelly Tyson.

Career statistics

Regular season and playoffs

International

Awards and honors

References

External links

1994 births
Living people
American men's ice hockey defensemen
Ice hockey players from Michigan
Michigan Wolverines men's ice hockey players
National Hockey League first-round draft picks
New York Rangers players
People from Rochester, Michigan
USA Hockey National Team Development Program players
Winnipeg Jets draft picks
Winnipeg Jets players
AHCA Division I men's ice hockey All-Americans